"Soltera" (English: "Single Woman") is a song by Puerto Rican singer Lunay and Puerto Rican producers Chris Jeday and Gaby Music, released through Star Island on February 21, 2019. A remix with Puerto Rican rappers Daddy Yankee and Bad Bunny was released on May 10, 2019. Following the release of the remix, it debuted at number one in Spain and reached number 66 on the US Billboard Hot 100.

Background
Suzy Exposito of Rolling Stone wrote that the song is about women who prefer being single and who "don't fall in love". The remix version featuring Puerto Rican rappers Daddy Yankee and Bad Bunny includes a sample of the chorus of the former's 2002 song "Ella Está Soltera".

Critical reception
Exposito of Rolling Stone called it a "delectable, standout summer anthem".

Commercial performance
In the United States, the original version of "Soltera" debuted at number 45 on Billboards Hot Latin Songs chart on March 23, 2019, eventually peaking at number 38 on March 30. Following the release of the remix version featuring Daddy Yankee and Bad Bunny, the single peaked at number three on May 25, 2019, becoming Lunay's first top five song on the list, as well as Daddy Yankee's 18th and Bad Bunny's sixth. On the Latin Rhythm Airplay chart, the remix marked Daddy Yankee's record extending 46th top 10. On the US Billboard Hot 100, the remix version debuted at number 73 on the week ending May 25, 2019.

Music video
A music video was released for both the original song and for the remix, the latter featuring Lunay, Daddy Yankee and Bad Bunny crashing a bachelorette party.

Charts

Weekly charts

Year-end charts

Certifications

See also
List of Billboard Argentina Hot 100 top-ten singles in 2019
List of Billboard number-one Latin songs of 2019

References

2019 singles
2019 songs
Daddy Yankee songs
Bad Bunny songs
Spanish-language songs
Songs written by Chris Jedi